A list of all currencies, current and historic. The local name of the currency is used in this list, with the adjectival form of the country or region.

A 
Afghani – Afghanistan
Akşa – Tuva
Angolar – Angola
Apsar - Abkhazia
Argentino – Argentina
Ariary – Madagascar
Austral – Argentina
Auksinas – Lithuania

B
Baht (บาท) – Thailand
Balboa – Panama
Birr – Ethiopia
Bitcoin – El Salvador
Bolívar – Venezuela
Boliviano – Bolivia
Budju – Algeria

C
Cedi – Ghana
Chervonets – Russia
Colón
Costa Rican colón – Costa Rica
Salvadoran colón – El Salvador
Continental currency – United States of America
Conventionsthaler – Holy Roman Empire
Córdoba – Nicaragua
Crown
Austrian crown - Austria
Austro-Hungarian crown - Austria-Hungary
Bohemian and Moravian crown - Bohemia and Moravia
British crown - United Kingdom
Czech crown - Czech Republic
Czechoslovak crown - Czechoslovakia
Danish crown - Denmark
English crown - Kingdom of England
Estonian crown - Estonia
Faroese crown - Faroe Islands
Fiume crown - Free State of Fiume
Greenlandic crown - Greenland
Hungarian crown - Hungary
Icelandic crown - Iceland
Liechtenstein crown - Liechtenstein
Norwegian crown - Norway
Slovak crown - Slovakia
Swedish crown - Sweden
Yugoslav crown - Yugoslavia
Cruzado
 – Portugal
Brazilian cruzado – Brazil
Brazilian cruzado novo – Brazil
Cruzeiro
Brazilian cruzeiro (old) – Brazil
Brazilian cruzeiro novo – Brazil
Brazilian cruzeiro (3rd iteration) – Brazil
Brazilian cruzeiro real – Brazil
Cupon – Moldova
Cryptocurrency – Internet-based currency
Customs gold unit – Republic of China (1912–1949)

D
Dalasi – The Gambia
Daler – Danish West Indies
Denar – North Macedonia
Denier – France
Dong – Vietnam
Dinar (دينار)
Algerian dinar – Algeria
Bahraini dinar – Bahrain
Bosnia and Herzegovina dinar – Bosnia and Herzegovina
Croatian dinar – Croatia
Iraqi dinar – Iraq
Jordanian dinar – Jordan, Palestinian territories
Kelantanese dinar – Kelantan
Krajina dinar – Krajina
Kuwaiti dinar – Kuwait
Libyan dinar – Libya
Republika Srpska dinar – Republika Srpska
Serbian dinar – Serbia
South Yemeni dinar – South Yemen
Sudanese dinar – Sudan
Swiss dinar – Iraq
Tunisian dinar – Tunisia
Yugoslav dinar – Yugoslavia
Diner – Andorra (commemorative only)
Dinero – Spain
Dinheiro – Portugal
Dirham (درهم)
Moroccan dirham – Morocco
United Arab Emirates dirham – United Arab Emirates
Dobra – São Tomé and Príncipe
Dollar
Antigua dollar – Antigua
Australian dollar – Australia, Kiribati, Nauru and Tuvalu
Bahamian dollar – Bahamas
Barbadian dollar – Barbados
Belize dollar – Belize
Bermudian dollar – Bermuda
British Columbia dollar – British Columbia
British North Borneo dollar – British North Borneo
British West Indies dollar – British West Indies
Brunei dollar – Brunei
Canadian dollar – Canada
Cayman Islands dollar – Cayman Islands
Continental dollar – Colonial America
Cook Islands dollar – Cook Islands
Dominican dollar – Dominica
East Caribbean dollar – Anguilla, Antigua and Barbuda, Dominica, Grenada, Montserrat, Saint Kitts and Nevis, Saint Lucia, Saint Vincent and the Grenadines
Fijian dollar – Fiji
Grenadan dollar – Grenada
Guyanese dollar – Guyana
Hawaiian dollar – Hawaii
Hong Kong dollar – Hong Kong
International dollar – hypothetical currency pegged 1:1 to the United States dollar
Jamaican dollar – Jamaica
Kiautschou dollar – Qingdao
Kiribati dollar – Kiribati
Liberian dollar – Liberia
Malaya and British Borneo dollar – Malaya, Singapore, Sarawak, British North Borneo and Brunei
Malayan dollar – Brunei, Malaysia and Singapore
Mauritian dollar – Mauritius
Mongolian dollar – Mongolia
Namibian dollar – Namibia
Nevisian dollar – Nevis
New Brunswick dollar – New Brunswick
New Zealand dollar – New Zealand, Cook Islands, Niue, Tokelau, Pitcairn Islands.
Newfoundland dollar – Newfoundland
Nova Scotian dollar – Nova Scotia
Prince Edward Island dollar – Prince Edward Island
Penang dollar – Penang
Puerto Rican dollar – Puerto Rico
Rhodesian dollar – Rhodesia
RTGS dollar - Zimbabwe
Saint Kitts dollar – Saint Kitts
Saint Lucia dollar – Saint Lucia
Saint Vincent dollar – Saint Vincent
Sarawak dollar – Sarawak
Sierra Leonean dollar – Sierra Leone
Singapore dollar – Singapore
Solomon Islands dollar – Solomon Islands
Straits dollar – Brunei, Malaysia and Singapore
Sumatran dollar – Sumatra
Surinamese dollar – Suriname
Old Taiwan dollar – Taiwan
New Taiwan dollar – Taiwan
Texas dollar – Republic of Texas
Tobagonian dollar – Tobago
Trinidadian dollar – Trinidad
Trinidad and Tobago dollar – Trinidad and Tobago
Tuvaluan dollar – Tuvalu (not an independent currency, equivalent to Australian dollar)
United States dollar – United States
See also International use of the U.S. dollar
Zimbabwean dollar – Zimbabwe
Đồng
North Vietnamese đồng – North Vietnam
South Vietnamese đồng – South Vietnam
Vietnamese đồng – Vietnam
Drachma (Δραχμή) – Greece
Dram (Դրամ)
Armenian dram – Armenia
Artsakh dram – Artsakh

E
Ekwele (Ekuele) – Equatorial Guinea
See also: Scudo (below)
Escudo
Angolan escudo – Angola
Cape Verdean escudo – Cape Verde
Chilean escudo – Chile
Mozambican escudo – Mozambique
Portuguese escudo – Portugal
Portuguese Guinean escudo – Guinea Bissau
Portuguese Indian escudo – Portuguese India
Portuguese Timorese escudo – East Timor
São Tomé and Príncipe escudo – São Tomé and Príncipe
Spanish escudo – Spain
Euro (Eυρώ, Евро) – Austria, Belgium, Cyprus, Estonia, Finland, France, Germany, Greece, Ireland, Italy, Latvia, Lithuania, Luxembourg, Malta, Netherlands, Portugal, Slovakia, Slovenia, Spain
 Countries that have made legal agreements with the EU to use the euro: Andorra, Monaco, San Marino, Vatican City
 Countries that unilaterally use the euro: Montenegro, Kosovo
 Currencies pegged to the euro: Cape Verdean escudo, CFA franc, CFP franc, Comorian franc, Bulgarian lev, Bosnia and Herzegovina convertible mark, São Tomé and Príncipe Dobra.

F
Fanam – Madras Presidency
Florin
Aruban florin – Aruba
Australian florin - Australia
Austrian florin – Austria
Austro-Hungarian florin - Austro-Hungary
British florin - United Kingdom
Dutch florin - Netherlands
East African florin – Kenya, Tanganyika, Uganda and Zanzibar
Florentine florin - Florence
Hungarian florin - Hungary
Irish florin - Ireland
Lombardy-Venetia florin – Lombardy-Venetia
Netherlands Antillean florin - Curaçao and Sint Maarten
New Zealand florin - New Zealand
Polish florin - Poland
South African florin - Union of South Africa
Surinamese florin - Suriname
Tuscan florin – Tuscany
Forint - Hungary
Franc
Algerian franc – Algeria
Belgian franc – Belgium
Burundian franc – Burundi
Cambodian franc – Cambodia
Central African CFA franc – Cameroon, Central African Republic, Chad, Republic of the Congo, Equatorial Guinea, Gabon
CFP franc – New Caledonia, French Polynesia, Wallis and Futuna
Comorian franc – Comoros
Congolese franc – Democratic Republic of the Congo (replaced in 1967, re-established in 1998)
Djiboutian franc – Djibouti
French franc – France
French Camerounian franc – French Cameroun
French Equatorial African franc – French Equatorial Africa
French Guianan franc – French Guiana
French Polynesian franc – French Polynesia
French West African franc – French West Africa
Geneva franc – Geneva
Guadeloupe franc – Guadeloupe
Guinean franc – Guinea (replaced in 1971, re-established in 1985)
Katangese franc – Katanga
Luxembourgish franc – Luxembourg
Malagasy franc – Madagascar
Malian franc – Mali
Martinique franc – Martinique
Monegasque franc – Monaco
Moroccan franc – Morocco
New Caledonian franc – New Caledonia
New Hebrides franc – New Hebrides
Réunion franc – Réunion
Rwanda and Burundi franc – Rwanda and Burundi
Rwandan franc – Rwanda
Saar franc – Saar
Saint Pierre and Miquelon franc – Saint Pierre and Miquelon
Swiss franc – Switzerland, Liechtenstein
Togolese franc – Togo
Tunisian franc – Tunisia
US occupation franc – France (issued and used by Allied soldiers, never backed by any government)
West African CFA franc – Benin, Burkina Faso, Côte d'Ivoire, Guinea-Bissau, Mali, Niger, Senegal, Togo
Vaud franc – Vaud
 Franco
Dominican franco – Dominican Republic
Luccan franco – Lucca
Ticino franco – Ticino
Frange – Korçë
Frank
Aargau frank – Aargau
Appenzell frank – Appenzell
Basel frank – Basel
Berne frank – Berne
Fribourg frank – Fribourg
Glarus frank – Glarus
Graubünden frank – Graubünden
Liechtenstein frank – Liechtenstein
Luzern frank – Luzern
Schaffhausen frank – Schaffhausen
Schwyz frank – Schwyz
Solothurn frank – Solothurn
St. Gallen frank – St. Gallen
Thurgau frank – Thurgau
Unterwalden frank – Unterwalden
Uri frank – Uri
Vlorë frank – Vlorë
Westphalian frank – Westphalia
Zürich frank – Zürich

G
Gazeta (Γαζετα) – Ionian Islands
Genevoise – Geneva
Gineih – Egypt
Gourde – Haiti
Grivna
Ukrainian grivna - Ukraine
Grosz – Kraków
Grzywna
Kraków grzywna - Poland
Guaraní – Paraguay
Guilder
Aruban guilder - Aruba
Guilder – British Guiana
Dutch guilder - Netherlands
Netherlands Antillean guilder – Netherlands Antilles
Surinamese guilder - Suriname
Guinea - United Kingdom
Egyptian guinea - Egypt
Gulden
Austro-Hungarian gulden – Austria-Hungary
Baden gulden – Baden
Bavarian gulden – Bavaria
Danzig gulden – Danzig
Dutch gulden – Netherlands
Fribourg gulden – Fribourg
Luzern gulden – Luzern
Netherlands Antillean gulden – Netherlands Antilles
Netherlands Indian gulden – Netherlands Indies
Neuchâtel gulden – Neuchâtel
Schwyz gulden – Schwyz
South German gulden – Baden, Bavaria, Frankfurt, Hohenzollern, Württemberg and other states
Surinamese gulden – Suriname
West New Guinean gulden – West New Guinea
Württemberg gulden – Württemberg
Caribbean guilder - Curaçao, Sint Maarten

H
Hryvnia (Гривня) – Ukraine
Hwan (圜 or 환) – South Korea

I
Inca – Peru
Inti – Peru

K
Karbovanets
Ukrainian karbovanets – Ukraine
Keping
Kelantan keping – Kelantan
Trengganu keping – Trengganu
Kina – Papua New Guinea
Kip – Laos
Kolion – Russia
Konvertibilna marka (Конвертибилна марка) – Bosnia and Herzegovina
Kori – Kutch
Korona – Hungary
Koruna
Bohemian and Moravian koruna – Bohemia and Moravia
Czech koruna – Czech Republic
Czechoslovak koruna – Czechoslovakia
Slovak koruna – Slovakia
Koruuni – Greenland
Króna
Faroese króna – Faroe Islands (not an independent currency, equivalent to Danish krone)
Icelandic króna – Iceland
Krona – Sweden
Krone
Austro-Hungarian krone – Austria
Danish krone – Denmark, Greenland
Liechtenstein krone – Liechtenstein
Norwegian krone – Norway
Yugoslav krone – Yugoslavia
Kronenthaler
Austrian Netherlands kronenthaler – Belgium
Holy Roman Empire kronenthaler – Holy Roman Empire
Kroon – Estonia
Kuna – Croatia
Kuna – Independent State of Croatia
Kwacha
Malawian kwacha – Malawi
Zambian kwacha – Zambia
Kwanza – Angola
Kyat – Myanmar

L
Laari – Maldives
Lari (ლარი) – Georgia
Lats – Latvia
Lek – Albania
Lempira – Honduras
Leone – Sierra Leone
Leu
Moldovan leu – Moldova
Romanian leu – Romania
Lev (Лев) – Bulgaria
Libra – Peru
Lilangeni – Eswatini
see also: Livre and pound (below)
Lira
Israeli lira (לירה, pound) – Israel
Italian lira – Italy
Italian East African lira – Italian East Africa
Italian Somaliland lira – Italian Somaliland
Lebanese lira (ليرة) – Lebanon
Luccan lira – Lucca
Maltese lira – Malta
Neapolitan lira – Naples (Kingdom of Joachim Murat)
Ottoman Turkish lira - Ottoman Empire
Papal States lira – Papal States
Parman lira – Parma
Sammarinese lira – San Marino
Sardinian lira – Sardinia
Tripolitanian lira (ليرة) – Tripolitania
Turkish lira – Turkey, North Cyprus
Turkish new lira – Turkey, North Cyprus
Tuscan lira – Tuscany
Vatican lira – Vatican City
Venetian lira – Venice
Syrian lira - Syria
Litas – Lithuania
Livre
Egyptian livre - Egypt
French colonial livre – French Guiana, Guadeloupe, Haiti, Martinique, Mauritius and Réunion
French livre – France
Guadeloupe livre – Guadeloupe
Jersey livre – Jersey
Lebanese livre - Lebanon
French livre parisis – France
French livre tournois – France
Haitian livre – Haiti
New France livre – New France
Luxembourgish livre – Luxembourg
Saint Lucia livre – Saint Lucia
Syrian livre - Syria
Ottoman Turkish livre - Ottoman empire
Loti – Lesotho

M
Manat
Azeri manat – Azerbaijan
Turkmenistani manat – Turkmenistan
Maneti - Georgia
Maravedí – Spain
Mark
Bosnia and Herzegovina convertible mark – Bosnia and Herzegovina
Danzig Mark – Danzig
Estonian mark – Estonia
German mark – Germany
Gold mark – Germany
German Papiermark – Germany
German reichsmark – Germany
German rentenmark – Germany
German South-West African Mark – German South-West Africa
East German mark – East Germany
Finnish mark - Finland
Hamburg mark – Hamburg
New Guinean mark – New Guinea
Polish mark - Poland
Saar Mark – Saar
Marka
Bosnia and Herzegovina konvertibilna marka (конвертибилна марка) – Bosnia and Herzegovina
Polish marka – Poland
Markka – Finland
Metica – Mozambique (proposed)
Metical – Mozambique
Mohar – Nepal
Mon – Japan
Mun – Korea

N
Nahar – Chechnia (planned and printed but never used)
Naira – Nigeria
Nakfa – Eritrea
New pence – Britain
Ngultrum (དངུལ་ཀྲམ) – Bhutan

O
Obol – Ionian Islands
ODE - Digital currencies
Ora – Orania, South Africa
Ostmark
Ostmark – Lithuania
East German mark – East Germany (known as the Ostmark, or "eastern mark")
Ostrubel – Lithuania
Ouguiya (أوقية) – Mauritania

P
Pa'anga – Tonga
Paisa
Bangladeshi Paisa (পয়সা) – Bangladesh
Indian Paisa (पैसा) – India
Nepalese Paisa (पैसा) – Nepal
Pakistani Paisa (پیسہ) – Pakistan
Pataca
Macanese pataca (澳門圓) – Macau
Maltese pataca – Malta
Portuguese Timorese pataca – Portuguese Timor
Pengő – Hungary
Penning
Swedish penning – Sweden
Norwegian penning – Norway
Perper
Serbian perper – Serbia
Montenegrin perper – Montenegro
Perun – Montenegro (proposed)
Peseta
Catalan peseta – Catalunya
Equatorial Guinean peseta – Equatorial Guinea
Peruvian peseta – Peru
Sahrawi peseta – Sahrawi Arab Democratic Republic
Spanish peseta – Spain
Peso
Argentine peso – Argentina
Argentine peso argentino – Argentina
Argentine peso ley – Argentina
Argentine peso moneda corriente – Argentina
Argentine peso moneda nacional – Argentina
Bolivian peso – Bolivia
Chilean peso – Chile
Colombian peso – Colombia
Costa Rican peso – Costa Rica
Cuban convertible peso – Cuba
Cuban peso – Cuba
Dominican peso – Dominican Republic
Ecuadorian peso – Ecuador
Guatemalan peso – Guatemala
Guinea Bissau peso – Guinea Bissau
Honduran peso – Honduras
Japanese government-issued Philippine fiat peso – Philippines
Malvinas Islands peso – Malvinas Islands (Falkland Islands)
Mexican peso – Mexico
Nicaraguan peso – Nicaragua
Paraguayan peso – Paraguay
Philippine peso fuerte – Philippines
Philippine peso – Philippines
Puerto Rican peso – Puerto Rico
Salvadoran peso – El Salvador
Uruguayan peso – Uruguay
Venezuelan peso – Venezuela
Petro – Venezuela
Phoenix – Greece
Piastra
Neapolitan piastra – mainland part of Two Sicilies
Sicilian piastra – Sicily
Two Sicilies piastra – Two Sicilies
Piastre
Cypriot piastre - Cyprus
Egyptian piastre - Egypt
Indochinese piastre – Cambodia, Laos and Vietnam
Jordanian piastre - Jordan
Lebanese piastre - Lebanon
Libyan piastre - Libya
Ottoman Turkish piastre – Ottoman Empire
Sudanese piastre
Syrian piastre - Syria
Turkish piastre - Turkey
Piaster - South Sudan
Piso - Philippines
Pitis – Brunei
Pond
Orange Free State pond - Orange Free State
Pond Vlaams - Burgundian Netherlands
South African Republic pond - Transvaal
Pound
Alderney pound – Alderney (commemorative, same as British pound
Anglo-Saxon pound – Anglo-Saxon England
Australian pound – Australia
Bahamian pound – Bahamas
Bermudian pound – Bermuda
Biafran pound – Biafra
British West African pound – Cameroon, The Gambia, Ghana, Liberia, Nigeria and Sierra Leone
Canadian pound – Canada
Connecticut pound – Connecticut
Cypriot pound – Cyprus, Akrotiri and Dhekelia
Delaware pound – Delaware
Egyptian pound – Egypt
Falkland Islands pound – Falkland Islands
Fijian pound – Fiji
Flemish pound - Burgundian Netherlands
French colonial pound – French Guiana, Guadeloupe, Haiti, Martinique, Mauritius and Réunion
French pound - France
Gambian pound – The Gambia
Georgia pound – Georgia
Ghanaian pound – Ghana
Gibraltar pound – Gibraltar
Guadeloupe pound – Guadeloupe
Guernsey pound – Guernsey
Haitian pound – Haiti
Irish pound – Ireland
Israeli pound – Israel
Italian pound - Italy
Jersey pound – Jersey
Lebanese pound - Lebanon
Libyan pound – Libya
Lombardo-Venetian pound - Lombardy–Venetia
Luccan pound - Lucca
Luxembourgish pound – Luxembourg
Malawian pound – Malaŵi
Maltese pound – Malta
Manx pound – Isle of Man
Maryland pound – Maryland
Massachusetts pound – Massachusetts
Neapolitan pound – Naples (Kingdom of Joachim Murat)
New Brunswick pound – New Brunswick
Newfoundland pound – Newfoundland
New France pound – New France
New Guinean pound – New Guinea
New Hampshire pound – New Hampshire
New Jersey pound – New Jersey
New York pound – New York
New Zealand pound – New Zealand
Nigerian pound – Nigeria
North Carolina pound – North Carolina
Nova Scotian pound – Nova Scotia
Oceanian pound – Kiribati, Nauru, New Guinea, Solomon Islands and Tuvalu
Orange Free State pound - Orange Free State
Ottoman Turkish pound - Ottoman Empire
Palestine pound – British Mandate of Palestine
Papal pound - Papal states
Parisian pound – France
Parman pound - Parma
Pennsylvania pound – Pennsylvania
Peruvian pound - Peru
Pound sterling – United Kingdom, British Indian Ocean Territory (accepted)
Prince Edward Island pound – Prince Edward Island
Rhode Island pound – Rhode Island
Rhodesia and Nyasaland pound – Rhodesia and Nyasaland
Rhodesian pound – Rhodesia
Saint Helena pound – Saint Helena
Saint Lucia pound – Saint Lucia
Sammarinese pound - San Marino
Sardinian pound - Sardinia
Pound Scots – Kingdom of Scotland
Solomon Islands pound – Solomon Islands
South African pound – South Africa
South African Republic pound - Transvaal
South Carolina pound – South Carolina
Southern Rhodesian pound – Southern Rhodesia
Sudanese pound – Sudan
South Sudanese pound – South Sudan
Syrian pound – Syria
Tongan pound – Tonga
Tours pound – France
Turkish pound - Turkey
Tuscan pound - Tuscany
Vatican pound - Vatican City
Venetian pound - Venice
Virginia pound – Virginia
West Indian pound – British West Indies
Western Samoan pound – Samoa
Zambian pound – Zambia
Pula – Botswana
Punt - Ireland

Q
Quetzal – Guatemala

R
Rai stones – Yap
Rand – South Africa
Reaal – Curaçao
Real
Angolan real – Angola
Argentine real – Argentina
Azorean real – Azores
Brazilian real (old) – Brazil
Brazilian real – Brazil
Cape Verde real – Cape Verde
Central American Republic real – Costa Rica, El Salvador, Guatemala, Honduras and Nicaragua
Colombian real – Colombia
Ecuadorian real – Ecuador
Gibraltar real – Gibraltar
Honduran real – Honduras
Mexican real – Mexico
Mozambican real – Mozambique
Paraguayan real – Paraguay
Peruvian real – Peru
Philippine real – Philippines
Portuguese Guinea real – Guinea Bissau
Portuguese real – Portugal (plural réis)
Santo Domingo real – Santo Domingo
Salvadoran real – El Salvador
São Tomé and Príncipe real – São Tomé and Príncipe
Spanish colonial real – Argentina, Bolivia, Chile, Colombia, Costa Rica, Cuba, Dominican Republic, Ecuador, El Salvador, Guatemala, Honduras, Mexico, Nicaragua, Panama, Paraguay, Peru, Uruguay and Venezuela
Spanish real – Spain
Venezuelan real – Venezuela
Reichsmark – Germany
Reichsthaler – Germany
Renminbi (人民币 or 人民幣) – China
Rentenmark – Germany
Rial (ريال)
Moroccan rial – Morocco
North Yemeni rial – North Yemen
Omani rial – Oman
Tunisian rial – Tunisia
Yemeni rial – Yemen
Riel – Cambodia
Rigsdaler
Danish West Indies rigsdaler – Danish West Indies
Danish rigsdaler – Denmark
Greenlandic rigsdaler – Greenland
Norwegian rigsdaler – Norway
Riksdaler – Sweden
Rijksdaalder – Netherlands
Ringgit
Malaysian ringgit – Malaysia
Brunei ringgit – Brunei – known in English as the dollar
Rixdollar – Ceylon
Riyal – Iran
Riyal (ريال)
Hejaz riyal – Hejaz
Qatari riyal – Qatar
Saudi riyal – Saudi Arabia
Zanzibari riyal – Zanzibar
Roepiah – Dutch East Indies
Rouble (Рубль)
Armenian rouble – Armenia
Azerbaijani rouble – Azerbaijan
Belarusian rubel – Belarus
Georgian rouble – Georgia
Latvian rouble - Latvia
Russian rouble – Russia
Soviet rouble – Soviet Union
Tajikistani rouble – Tajikistan
Transcaucasian rouble – Transcaucasia
Transnistrian rubla – Transnistria
Rublis – Latvia
Rufiyah (ދިވެހި ރުފިޔ) – Maldives
Rupee
Afghan rupee – Afghanistan
Bhutanese rupee – Bhutan
Burmese rupee – Burma
Danish Indian rupee – Danish India
East African rupee – Kenya, Somalia, Tanzania and Uganda
French Indian rupee – French India
Gulf rupee – Bahrain, Kuwait, Oman, Qatar and UAE
Hyderabad rupee – Hyderabad
Indian rupee (रुपया) – India
Javan rupee – Java
Mauritian rupee – Mauritius
Nepalese rupee (रुपैयाँ) – Nepal
Pakistani rupee (روپیہ) – Pakistan
Portuguese Indian rupia – Portuguese India
Seychellois rupee – Seychelles
Sri Lankan rupee (රුපියල්, ரூபாய்) – Sri Lanka
Travancore rupee – Travancore
Zanzibari rupee – Zanzibar
Rupiah
Indonesian rupiah – Indonesia
Italian Somaliland rupia – Italian Somaliland
Riau rupiah – Riau
West New Guinea rupiah – West New Guinea
Rupie – Burundi, Rwanda and Tanzania
Ryō – Japan

S
Schilling – Austria
see also: Escudo (above)
Scudo
Bolivian scudo – Bolivia
Lombardy-Venetia scudo – Lombardy-Venetia
Maltese scudo – Malta
Milanese scudo – Milan
Papal States scudo – Papal States
Piedmont scudo – Piedmont and other mainland parts of the Kingdom of Sardinia
Sardinian scudo – Sardinia
Setu (Historically used in Southern India and Sri Lanka)
Shah (Шаг) – Ukraine
Shekel
New Shekel (שקל חדש) – Israel, Gaza Strip, West Bank
Shekel (שקל) – Israel, Gaza Strip, West Bank
Shilling
East African shilling – Kenya, Somalia, Tanzania and Uganda
Kenyan shilling – Kenya
Somali shilling – Somalia
Somaliland shilling – Somaliland
Tanzanian shilling – Tanzania
Ugandan shilling – Uganda
Skender – Korçë
Sol – Peru
Sol de oro – Peru
Soum
Kyrgyz som (Сом) – Kyrgyzstan
Uzbek soum (Сўм) – Uzbekistan
Somalo – Italian Somaliland
Somoni (Сомонӣ) – Tajikistan
Speciedaler – Norway
Speciethaler – Schleswig-Holstein
Srang – Tibet
Sterling - United Kingdom
Sucre – Ecuador
Syli – Guinea

T
Tael (兩, liǎng) – China
Taka (টাকা) – Bangladesh 
Tala – Samoa
Tallero – Eritrea
Talonas – Lithuania
Tangka – Tibet
Tenga
Bukharan tenga – Bukhara
Kokand tenga – Kokand
Khwarazmi tenga – Khwarazm
Tenge (Теңге) – Kazakhstan
Thaler – Germany, Austria, Hungary
Basel Thaler – Basel
Berne Thaler – Berne
Bremen Thaler – Bremen
Danzig Thaler – Danzig
Geneva thaler – Geneva
Hannovarian Thaler – Hannover
Hesse-Kassel Thaler – Hesse-Kassel (or Hesse-Cassel)
Mecklenburg Thaler – Mecklenburg
Prussian Thaler – Prussia
St. Gallen Thaler – St. Gallen
Saxon Thaler – Kingdom of Saxony
Solothurn Thaler – Solothurn
Valais thaler – Valais
Westphalian Thaler – Westphalia
Zürich Thaler – Zürich
Tical – Cambodia
Tögrög (Tөгрөг) – Mongolia
Tolar – Slovenia
Toman (تومان) – Iran
Trade dollar
British trade dollar – Great Britain
Japanese trade dollar – Japan
United States trade dollar – United States of America
Tugrik – Mongolia

V
Vatu – Vanuatu
Venezolano – Venezuela
Vereinsthaler
Hanoverian vereinsthaler – Hannover
Hesse-Kassel vereinsthaler – Hesse-Kassel (or Hesse-Cassel)
Mecklenburg vereinsthaler – Mecklenburg
Prussian vereinsthaler – Prussia
Saxon vereinsthaler – Saxony

W
Wén (文) – China
Won (원,圓)
 Korean won – Korea
 Korean People's won – North Korea
 Korean Republic won – South Korea

Y
Yang (兩) – Korea
Yen (円)
Korean yen – Korea
Japanese military yen – Hong Kong
Japanese yen – Japan
Taiwanese yen – Taiwan
Yuan
Yuan (元, 圆 or 圓) – China
Chinese yuan (元, 圆 or 圓) – China
Chinese renminbi yuan (人民币 or 人民幣) – China
Manchukuo yuan (圓) – Manchukuo
Old Taiwanese yuan – Taiwan
New Taiwanese yuan – Taiwan

Z
Polish Złoty - Poland

See also

 List of circulating currencies
 List of countries by exchange rate regime
 List of central banks
 ISO 4217